Rob McKittrick (born August 31, 1973) is an American filmmaker who directed the 2005 independent film Waiting... starring Ryan Reynolds. He also wrote the sequel to the film, Still Waiting... (2009).

Early life and education
McKittrick grew up in Bradenton, Florida and graduated from Bayshore High School in 1991. Following high school, he attended the State College of Florida, Manatee–Sarasota.

Career 
While working jobs in multiple restaurants in the 1990s, McKittrick conceived the original concept for Waiting... based on his experiences working at Bennigans in Bradenton, Fl. He credited the idea for the story to two fellow waiters , Ben Bakker and Jim Moses, who helped write the script.

In 2009, he worked on Universal and Jay Baruchel's project based on Baruchel's Johnny Klutz character. He co-wrote the 2018 comedy Tag for New Line Cinema.

Personal life 
McKittrick lives in the Hollywood Hills neighborhood of Los Angeles.

References

External links

Rob McKittrick on Myspace

1973 births
Living people
People from Bradenton, Florida
American male screenwriters
Film directors from Florida
Screenwriters from Florida
State College of Florida, Manatee–Sarasota alumni